"April Sun in Cuba" is a song recorded by New Zealand group Dragon, released in October 1977. It is the first single to be released from Dragon's fourth studio album Running Free. "April Sun in Cuba" first charted on 7 November 1977, peaking at number 2 on the Kent Music Report Singles Chart and staying on the chart for 22 weeks. It also reached number 9 on the New Zealand singles chart. The b-side of the single, a non-album track called "Telephone", was credited to "Dr. Agony".

Track listing 
 April Sun in Cuba (Marc Hunter, Paul Hewson) - 3:24
 Telephone (Paul Hewson, Marc Hunter, Todd Hunter) - 3:10

Charts

Weekly charts

Year-end charts

Certifications

Personnel  
 Bass – Todd Hunter
 Guitar – Robert Taylor
 Keyboards – Paul Hewson
 Lead Vocals – Marc Hunter
 Percussion – Kerry Jacobson
 Vocals – Paul Hewson, Robert Taylor, Todd Hunter
Production
 Producer – Peter Dawkins
 Written by - Marc Hunter, Paul Hewson

References 

1977 songs
Dragon (band) songs
1977 singles
Portrait Records singles
CBS Records singles
Songs written by Marc Hunter
Song recordings produced by Peter Dawkins (musician)